Tarlochan Singh Tur (15 February 1947 – 2016) was an Indian politician. He was elected to the Lok Sabha, the lower house of the Parliament of India, from the Tarn Taran constituency of Punjab as a member of the Shiromani Akali Dal.

References

External links
 Official biographical sketch in Parliament of India website

1947 births
Shiromani Akali Dal politicians
Lok Sabha members from Punjab, India
India MPs 1984–1989
India MPs 1998–1999
India MPs 1999–2004
Living people
Politicians from Amritsar district
People from Tarn Taran Sahib